The Belgium women's national under-21 field hockey team represents Belgium in women's international under-21 field hockey competitions and is controlled by the Royal Belgian Hockey Association, the governing body for field hockey in Belgium. The team plays in the EuroHockey Junior Championships and has qualified three times for the Junior World Cup.

Tournament record

Junior World Cup
 2013 – 13th place
 2016 – 6th place
 2022 – Withdrew
 2023 – Qualified

EuroHockey Junior Championship
 1979 – 
 1981 – 4th place
 1984 – 6th place
 2008 – 7th place
 2012 – 5th place
 2014 – 5th place
 2017 – 
 2019 – 4th place
 2022 –

EuroHockey Junior Championship II
 2000 – 6th place
 2006 – 
 2010 –

EuroHockey Junior Championship III
 2004 – 

Source:

See also
 Belgium men's national under-21 field hockey team
 Belgium women's national field hockey team

References

Field hockey
Women's national under-21 field hockey teams
National under-21